The 2019 Port Vila FA Cup or the 2019 PVFA Opening Cup, is a cup in the country of Vanuatu, held for association football clubs competing in the Port Vila Football League It is ran and overseen by the Port Vila Football Association. 

There were three cups running at the same time, one for each division of Port Vila Football League.

Participants

All teams and leagues are for the 2019/20 season

Premier League Cup - 2019 Edition

Group A

Group B

Semi-finals

Final

See also

Port Vila Shield
VFF National Super League
Port Vila FA Cup
Port Vila Football League
2019-20 Port Vila Premier League
Sport in Vanuatu

References 

Football competitions in Vanuatu